The Romanian leu (plural lei ; ISO code: RON; numeric code: 946) is the currency of Romania. It is subdivided into 100 , a word that means "money" in Romanian.

Etymology 
The name of the currency means "lion", and is derived from the Dutch thaler ( "lion thaler/dollar"). The Dutch leeuwendaalder was imitated in several German and Italian cities. These coins circulated in Romania, Moldova and Bulgaria and gave their name to their respective currencies: the Romanian leu, the Moldovan leu and the Bulgarian lev.

History

First leu: 1867–1947

In 1860, the Domnitor Alexandru Ioan Cuza attempted to create a national românul ("the Romanian") and the romanat; however, the project was not approved by the Ottoman Empire.

On 22 April 1867, a bimetallic currency was adopted, with the leu equal to 5 grams of 83.5% silver or 0.29032 grams of gold. The first leu coin was minted in Romania in 1870.

Before 1878 the silver Russian ruble was valued so highly as to drive the native coins out of circulation. Consequently, in 1889, Romania unilaterally joined the Latin Monetary Union and adopted a gold standard. Silver coins were legal tender only up to 50 lei. All taxes and customs dues were to be paid in gold and, owing to the small quantities issued from the Romanian mint, foreign gold coins were current, especially French 20-franc pieces (equal at par to 20 lei), Ottoman lira (22.70 lei), Russian rubles (20.60 lei) and British sovereigns (25.22 lei).

Romania left the gold standard in 1914 and the leu's value fell. The exchange rate was pegged at 167.20 lei to US$1 on 7 February 1929, US$1 = 135.95 lei on 5 November 1936, US$1 = 204.29 lei on 18 May 1940, and US$1 = 187.48 lei on 31 March 1941. During Romania's World War II alliance with Nazi Germany, the leu was pegged to the reichsmark at a rate of 49.50 lei to RM 1, falling to 59.5 lei = RM 1 in April 1941. During Soviet occupation, the exchange rate was 1 ruble to 100 lei. After the war, the value of the currency fell dramatically and the National Bank issued a new leu, which was worth 20,000 old lei.

Second leu: 1947–1952
A revaluation ("Great stabilization") took place on 15 August 1947, replacing the old leu at a rate of 20,000 old lei = 1 new leu. No advance warning was given and there were limits for the sums to be converted in the new currency: 5 million old lei for farmers and 3 million old lei for workers and pensioners.

Out of the 48.5 billion old lei in circulation, only around half were changed to new lei. The most affected was the middle and upper classes, who were later also affected by the nationalization of 1948. At the time of its introduction, 150 new lei equalled 1 US dollar.

Third leu (ROL): 1952–2005

On 28 January 1952, another new leu was introduced. Unlike the previous revaluation, different rates were employed for different kinds of exchange (cash, bank deposits, debts etc.) and different amounts. These rates ranged from 20 to 400 "old lei" for one "new" leu. Again, no advance warning was given before the reform took place.

Between 1970 and 1989, the official exchange rate was fixed by the government through law. This exchange rate was used by the government to calculate the value of foreign trade, but foreign currency was not available to be bought and sold by private individuals. Owning or attempting to buy or sell foreign currency was a criminal offence, punishable with a prison sentence that could go up to ten years (depending on the amount of foreign currency found under one's possession). International trade was therefore considered as part of another economic circuit than domestic trade, and given greater priority.

This inflexibility and the existence of surplus money due to constant economic decline in the 1980s, mixed with the need for more foreign currency and the refusal of the Ceaușescu regime to accept inflation as a phenomenon in order to attain convertibility, led to one of the greatest supply side crises in Romanian history, culminating with the introduction of partial food rationing in 1980 and full rationing for all basic foods in 1986/87. This was a major factor in growing discontent with Ceaușescu, and contributed in part to the fall of the Communist regime in 1989.

In the post-communist period, there has been a switch in the material used for banknotes and coins. Banknotes have switched from special paper to special plastic, while coins switched from aluminum to more common coin alloys (probably partly due to technical limitations of coin-operated vending machines). The transition has been gradual for both, but much faster for the banknotes which are currently all made of plastic. There has been a period in which all banknotes were made of plastic and all coins were made of aluminum, a very distinctive combination.
 
In the 1990s, after the downfall of communism, inflation ran high due to reform failures, the legalization of owning foreign currency in 1990, reaching rates as high as 300% per year in 1993. By September 2003, one euro was exchanged for more than 40,000 lei, this being its peak value. Following a number of successful monetary policies in the late 1990s and early 2000s, the situation became gradually more stable, with one-digit inflation in 2005.

The Romanian leu was briefly the world's least valued currency unit, from January (when the Turkish lira dropped six zeros) to July 2005. However, the 1,000,000 lei banknote was not the highest Romanian denomination ever; a 5,000,000 lei note had been issued in 1947.

Fourth leu (RON): 2005–present

On 1 July 2005, the leu was revalued at the rate of 10,000 "old" lei (ROL) for one "new" leu (RON), thus psychologically bringing the purchasing power of the leu back in line with those of other major Western currencies. The term chosen for the action was "denominare", similar to the English term "redenomination". The first day brought difficulties adjusting to the new paper currencies and closed ATMs (that needed reprogramming) and forcing a new calculation habit that slowed down shops and annoyed some sales staff and older shoppers. The old ROL currency banknotes remained in circulation until 31 December 2006 (coins remained in circulation only until 31 December 2005), but all accounts have been converted starting 1 July 2005. There is no conversion time limit between the currencies. Retailers had to display prices in both old and new currency from 1 March 2005 until 30 June 2006. The appreciation of the leu during 2005 was about 20% against a basket of major currencies.

As of 2006, the revaluation was a potential source of confusion, especially to visitors, since both old and new currency values were commonly quoted. When written, the very large amounts in old currency are usually obvious, but in speaking inhabitants might refer to an amount of 5 new lei as simply "fifty" in reference to its value of 50,000 old lei. As of 2020, it is still common to call 100 lei "un milion" or one million and 500 lei "cinci milioane" or five million.

Speculation about joining the Eurozone

In 2014, Romania's Convergence Report set a target date of 1 January 2019 for euro adoption. In April 2014, Romania had met four out of the seven criteria for accession to the Eurozone. In recent years, however, Romania had made step backs regarding the adopting of the euro; the 2020 Convergence Report concluded that Romania does not meet any of the four economic criteria necessary for this process. In February 2021, then-Prime Minister Florin Cîțu stated that Romania could join the Eurozone in 2027 or 2028, although Romanian economist  announced in December 2021 that this date had been delayed to 2029.

Coins

The Romanian leu has a history of instability. As such, the size and composition of coins has changed frequently.

First leu

In 1867, copper 1, 2, 5 and 10 bani were issued, with gold 20 lei (known as poli after the French Napoleons) first minted the next year. These were followed, between 1870 and 1873, by silver 50 bani, 1 and 2 lei. Silver 5 lei were added in 1880. Uniquely, the 1867 issue used the spelling 1 banu rather than 1 ban.

In 1900, cupronickel 5, 10, and 20 ban coins were introduced, with holed versions following in 1905. The production of coins ceased in 1914, recommencing in 1921 with aluminum 25 and 50 ban pieces. Cupronickel 1 and 2 lei coins were introduced in 1924, followed by nickel brass 5, 10, and 20 lei in 1930. In 1932, silver 100 lei coins were issued. However, inflation meant that in 1935, smaller silver 250 lei coins were introduced with nickel 100 lei coins being issued in 1936, followed by nickel 50 lei in 1937.

In 1941 and 1942, zinc 2, 5, and 20 lei coins were introduced, together with silver 200 and 500 lei. Nickel-clad-steel 100 lei followed in 1943, with brass 200, and 500 lei issued in 1945. In 1946 and 1947, postwar inflation brought the exchange rate even lower, and a new coinage was issued consisting of aluminum 500 lei, brass 2,000, and 10,000 lei, and silver 25,000, and 100,000 lei.

Second leu

Coins were issued in 1947 after the revaluation in denominations of 50 bani, 1, 2, and 5 lei and depicted the portrait of King Michael I. This coin series was brief, preceded by the king's abdication less than a year later and replaced following the establishment of communist administration in Romania in 1948, reissued gradually in denominations of 1, 2, 5, and 20 lei in nickel-brass alloy, and later in aluminum. All second leu coins were discontinued and devalued in late 1952.

Third leu

Coins were first issued in 1952 in denominations of 1, 3, 5, 10, 25, and 50 bani, with aluminum bronze for 1, 3, and 5 bani, and cupronickel for 10, 25, and 50 bani. These coins featured the state arms and name "Republica Populara Româna".

In 1960, a new series of coins was issued in denominations of 5, 15, & 25 bani and 1 and 3 lei struck in nickel-plated steel. Starting in 1966, the name on all coins was changed to "Republica Socialista Romania" following the ascent of Nicolae Ceaușescu, though all pre-1966 coins of these denominations remained valid. In 1975, the composition of 5 and 15 ban coins was changed to aluminum, and the 25 bani followed suit in 1982. In 1978, an aluminum 5 leu coin was introduced. These denominations remained in use until 1991, particularly the 5 lei, following the lifting of state-mandated exchange rates and price controls.

In 1991, a new coin series with post-communist iconography and new valuations was released in denominations of 1, 5, 10, 20, 50, and 100 lei. These coins gradually lost value with inflation, and a new series was introduced in 1998 with an aluminum-magnesium alloy 500 leu and 1,000 and 5,000 leu coins in 2000.

Fourth leu

The coins that are currently in circulation are one ban, made of brass-plated steel; five bani, made of copper-plated steel; ten bani in nickel-plated steel; and fifty bani in nickel brass. These were first introduced into circulation in 2005 with the fourth revaluation and are all currently valid.
There are six 50 bani commemorative circulating coins made in 2010, 2011, 2012, 2014, 2015 and 2016.

The current coins of the Romanian leu are by any objective standards of functional austere design, surpassing in lack of decoration even the plainest Communist-era predecessors.

The one ban coin was rarely seen and not in demand by either banks or many retailers; the 'situation' has changed and the coin is not uncommonly found (as of 2015). Supermarkets continue habitually to advertise prices such as 9.99 (lei), and frequently price goods to the precise ban such as 9,47; indeed, as of 2014, very few of the prices displayed at the Carrefour online site (for example) display prices to the nearest 5 or 10 bani. In practice, many retailers round totals to the nearest 5 or 10 bani for cash payments, or even whole leu, although (inter)national supermarket chains generally give exact change. For card payments the exact amount (not rounded) is always charged. The reversion to single ban pricing (and change giving) is perhaps due to the (effective) government drive for shops/businesses to give a receipt, an accurate bon fiscal (to avoid tax evasion) for every transaction. Official notices must be prominently displayed in all shops/restaurants that an accurate receipt must be given.

Banknotes

First leu

In 1877, state notes were introduced in denominations of 5, 10, 20, 50, 100, and 500 lei. In 1880, these notes were overstamped for issue by the Banca Națională a României, which began to issue regular notes in 1881 in denominations of 20, 100, and 1,000 lei.

In 1914, five leu notes were reintroduced, followed by one and two leu notes in 1915 and 500 lei in 1916. The Ministry of Finance issued very small-sized notes for 10, 25 and 50 bani in 1917. 5,000 lei notes were introduced in 1940, followed by 10,000 and 100,000 lei in 1945 and 1,000,000 and 5,000,000 lei in 1947. In 1945, the Ministry of Finance issued 20 and 100 leu notes to replace those of the National Bank.

Second leu
In 1947, the Ministry of Finance introduced 20 lei notes and Banca Națională a României introduced 100, 500 and 1,000 lei notes. In 1949,  took over the production of paper money and issued 500 and 1,000 lei notes.

Third leu

In 1952, the Ministry of Finance introduced notes for 1, 3, and 5 lei, and the  introduced 10, 25 and 100 leu notes. In 1966, the Banca Națională a Republicii Socialiste România took over the production of all paper money, issuing notes for 1, 3, 5, 10, 25, 50. and 100 lei.

In 1991, 500 and 1,000 leu notes were introduced, followed by 200 and 5,000 leu notes in 1992, 10,000 lei in 1994, 50,000 lei in 1996, 100,000 lei in 1998, 500,000 lei in 2000 and 1,000,000 lei in 2003. There was also a commemorative 2,000 lei note introduced in 1999 celebrating the total solar eclipse that occurred on 11 August 1999. The final issues of the 2,000, 10,000, 50,000, 100,000, 500,000, and 1,000,000 lei were polymer notes.

Notes in circulation at the revaluation were:
 10,000 lei (became 1 leu)
 50,000 lei (became )
 100,000 lei (became )
 500,000 lei (became )
 1,000,000 lei (became )

Fourth series
The designs of the 1 leu, 5, 10, 50, and  notes are based on those of the earlier 10,000, 50,000, 100,000, 500,000, and 1,000,000 leu notes which they replaced. The  note was redesigned in November 2008 (most of the graphic elements are identical, some of the safety elements were changed, making its safety features similar to the lower-valued notes for 1 leu and ). The highest-value coin (in general circulation) is 50 bani (around 15 cents US or 9 pence sterling); the 1 leu note (there is no coin) has, therefore, a value of (approximately) 25 cents US or 18 pence sterling, or around 23 euro cents.

In preparation for Romania joining the Eurozone, banknotes of the fourth leu are of equal size to Euro banknotes.

The  banknote was introduced by the National Bank of Romania in November 2021.

List of current banknotes

Exchange rates

See also
 Economy of Romania
 History of coins in Romania
 Banknotes of the Romanian leu
 Romania and the euro
 List of currencies in Europe

References

External links

 Current legal tender pictures
 Site with historical and current Romanian coins
 The Banknotes of Romania 
 The Banknotes of the Socialist Republic of Romania 
 The Banknotes of Romania - Nearly Complete

Leu, Romanian
1867 introductions